The  was a Japanese New Left terrorist organization that existed from 1972 to 1975.

The EAAJAF self-identifies as a leftist group which espouses Anti-Japaneseism ideology of revolution against the Japanese state, corporations, and symbols of Japanese imperialism, and was classified as a far-left illegal group inspired by anti-Japanese anarchism. The EAAJAF committed a series of bombings as three cells during the early 1970s, including the 1974 Mitsubishi Heavy Industries bombing, until it was disbanded when most of its membership were arrested by Japanese authorities.

Some members joined the Japanese Red Army.

Origins and history

L-Class Struggle Committee of Hosei University 
The roots of the East Asia Anti-Japan Armed Front lie in the L-Class Struggle Committee, which was formed in the spring of 1970 by Masashi Daidōji, at that time enrolled in history courses at the department of humanities of Hosei University in Tokyo. The L-Class Struggle Committee's name comes from the university class that Daidōji was affiliated with, and factionally it was classified as "non-sect radical", a Japanese New Left movement who refused to align with the communists or any other established group. Daidōji called upon the philosophy and literature students of other departments to participate and membership briefly swelled to more than 100 people. However, along with the demise of the influential Zenkyoto (or All Campus Joint Struggle Committee) movement, the L-Class Struggle Committee also naturally came to an end and Daidōji then dropped out of Hosei University.

The Research Group 
In August 1970, a "Research Group" was set up centering on Daidōji and the principal members of the L-Class Struggle Committee. This Group did intensive studies on the "evil deeds" of Japanese imperialism in Asia which fomented among them extreme anti-Japanese ideas. They used books such as Park Kyung Sik's  as their then current study material. At the same time they also had an interest in urban guerrilla warfare and studied material on resistance movements, and before long these two topics converged into the idea that they had to build an armed anti-Japanese movement. In January 1971, the Research Group began undertaking their first experiments with homemade bombs.

Start of the "campaign struggle" 
To start off it was decided that they would blow up structures that were symbols of Japanese imperialism as part of the so-called "campaign struggle" making an appeal to the masses. They undertook three attacks, the bombing at the Koa Kannon temple on 12 December 1971, the bombing of the Soji-ji Ossuary on 6 April 1972, and the bombing of the Fusetsu no Gunzo and Institute of Northern Cultures on 23 October 1972. They considered these targets to be associated respectively with Japan’s participation in World War II, the Japanese colonization of Korea, and the subjugation of the Ainu of Hokkaido.

After these three attacks, they decided to shift to full-blown terrorist bombings.

Birth of the East Asia Anti-Japan Armed Front 
In December 1972, the group decided on the name East Asia Anti-Japan Armed Front (EAAJAF) but were aware that this was a name that could be used generically by any anti-Japanese group. The EAAJAF decided they needed individual names for their own cells, with Daidōji and his team settled on the name  to express an image of proud independence.

In 1973, the EAAJAF were preparing for their attacks, developing bombs and saving up a war chest to fund their operations. They constructed the bombs with the tools and basic necessities that they had on hand, but there were also members who dug under the floor of their own apartments and created underground bomb-making cellars. In addition, to bring their messages to the public they set about writing their own tract, the Hara Hara Tokei, which they published in March 1974. On 14 August 1974, they tried to blow up the iron bridge over which Emperor Shōwa's royal train was travelling, which they code-named the "Rainbow Operation". However, the plot was aborted because a member was spotted shortly before it was to be put into action.

The following day, an assassination attempt on the life of President Park Chung-hee of South Korea was made by Mun Segwang, a member of Chongryon and a militant who hailed from the "Armed Front of High School Students for Violent Revolution", an organization affiliated with the Proletarian Army that in turn had a number of ties with anarchists. The EAAJAF's Wolf cell was spurred into new terrorist bombings in sympathy with Mun Segwang.

On 30 August 1974, the EAAJAF committed the 1974 Mitsubishi Heavy Industries bombing when they exploded a bomb at the Tokyo head office of Mitsubishi Heavy Industries, killing 8 people and wounding 376 others. The bombing caused destruction that far surpassed EAAJAF's expectations, and from there they launched serial bombings against Japanese corporations with the newly joined  and  cells until May 1975.

Mass arrests 
At first Ryu Ota, who, like the EAAJAF, advocated an "Ainu revolution" at that time, was suspected as a member. Before long Ota's innocence was proven, but the Japanese police presumed that there were EAAJAF operatives somewhere in his ideological circle and, as a result of deciding to target the "Revolt Society" and the "Contemporary Thought Society" that Ota was involved with, the members Nodoka Saito and Norio Sasaki floated to the surface. While tailing these two, the other members of the group were deduced one after another. Sasaki joined Soka Gakkai and though he pretended to be an enthusiastic member doing things like giving the lotus sutra every day, he was not able to escape the eyes of the law.

On 19 May 1975, seven key members: Masashi Daidōji and his wife Ayako, Saito, Ekida, Sasaki, Masunaga, and Kurokawa, were arrested as well as a nursing student who was considered a collaborator. Saito committed suicide soon after his arrest, and two members who escaped the roundup, Ugajin and Kirishima, were put on the national wanted list.

Developments since the EAAJAF's demise 
On 4 August 1975, the Japanese Red Army took hostages at the United States consulate in Kuala Lumpur and the Japanese government gave in to their demands to release Norio Sasaki among others. The trials of the remaining terrorists were started from 25 December 1975, but on 28 September 1977 a team of Japanese Red Army operatives including Sasaki hijacked Japan Airlines Flight 472 and two days later forced the release of Ayako Daidōji and Yukiko Ekida. They both joined the Japanese Red Army. In 1979, Hara Hara Tokei Special Issue #1 was published underground by a group called East Asia Anti-Japan Armed Front KF Unit, named after the codenames of two members who committed suicide. It was believed that the book, which reaffirmed the anti-Japanese armed struggle, was created by the still-jailed members because the address of the publisher was the Tokyo Detention House.

Masashi Daidōji and Toshiaki Masunaga were given the death penalty, and Yoshimasa Kurokawa was given life imprisonment with hard labor. In July 1982, Hisaichi Ugajin was arrested and sentenced to 18 years imprisonment with hard labor. On 24 March 1995 Yukiko Ekida was detained while in hiding in Romania on suspicion of forging a private document. She was deported, arrested on the plane to Japan, and at trial was sentenced to 20 years imprisonment with hard labor. She was released on March 23, 2017, after completing her sentence. Today, Norio Sasaki and Ayako Daidōji are still wanted internationally. The statute of limitations on Satoshi Kirishima's crimes has elapsed.

Daidōji died in prison on May 24, 2017, due to complications from multiple myeloma. Masunaga, who is still on death row, is requesting new trials while undertaking a "struggle behind bars" which includes writing revolutionary essays and books from his prison cell. Daidōji also engaged in this "struggle" up until his death.

Distinguishing characteristics 
The United Red Army, for example, murdered 14 of its 29 members in less than a year through such sessions. By contrast, there were no bloody purges in the EAAJAF and those members who had family commitments or were unable to mentally endure the struggle were permitted to leave without penalty. Nahoko Arai, who helped write Hara Hara Tokei, and Yoshimi Fujisawa, who was part of the group's early trainings with explosives, both left the group without incident after raising personal issues.

The EAAJAF did not have any centralized systems or leadership such as a central committee. The leaders of EAAJAF's three cells were in contact with one another and nothing more. There was no mingling among fellow members and even their ideological positions were different in subtle ways.  EAAJAF members also did not disassociate from the public sphere. They adopted the policy of working by day as normal corporate employees or servers at cafes and preparing their operations by night. This policy was also set out in Hara Hara Tokei and the idea was that by not engaging in activism and pretending to be completely upstanding citizens they would not arouse the mistrust of those around them. Because of that, EAAJAF members did not participate in labor movements at their workplaces or social movements in their neighborhoods.

Whereas other groups such as Red Army Faction of the Communist League, a precursor to the Japanese Red Army, raised funds through illegal means including bank robberies, EAAJAF operatives received wages working at regular jobs and secured a legal source of revenue by investing half of their earnings into their operations. Even though the EAAJAF recognized self-funding as a core principle, on the other hand they declined to completely rule out robberies following a full examination of their targets and methods.

Ideology 

As they studied the history of aggression by Japan against Korea and the Ainu, the EAAJAF acquired its personal "anti-Japanese ideology". They considered not only those in power, but also Japanese corporations and laborers as "perpetrators of imperialist aggression" and believed that they were acceptable targets for attack. In their claim of responsibility released after the 1974 bombing of Mitsubishi Heavy Industries they justified the indiscriminate terrorist attack by saying "People who were wounded or who died in the bombing are not uninvolved normal citizens. They are colonialists". Because of these dangerous and overly self-righteous ideas, even with the influence of the then New Left the number of people who supported the EAAJAF was few. Even the Front's leader, Masashi Daidōji, eventually apologized for his tactics.

Since the 1970s, most Japanese New Left organizations had undertaken cautious "situational analyses" and based on those they acted in a planned manner to "start the revolution in Japan" from their own prepared blueprints, even if they didn't always directly confront their own gradual alienation from the Japanese masses. In contrast to this, organizations like the EAAJAF that advocated "anti-Japanese ideology", even if they did have the ambitious goal of "destroying Japan", did not have a concrete plan to achieve it. On the basis of their ideology, the EAAJAF undertook ad hoc terrorist attacks as "payback for the historical sins of Japanese imperialism", and they tended to not pay much heed to whether or not they had popular support, though they did argue that the day laborers of Sanya were true revolutionary warriors.

Membership 
The EAAJAF divided itself into small terrorist cells symbolically named after animals to represent the nature of their organization and the themes of its ideology:

The Wolf cell likened the 'oppressed masses' who were being 'tormented by capitalists' to the extinct Honshu wolf. Its members were the founder Masashi Daidōji, his wife Ayako Daidōji, as well as Toshiaki Masunaga and Norio Sasaki.
The Fangs of the Earth cell made its goal an ideal world without nation-states or capitalists and likened itself to fangs rising from the Earth to oppose them. Its members were Nodoka Saito and his wife Yukiko Ekida.
The Scorpion cell likened itself to a scorpion that will topple big capital and big buildings with the deadly poison of its own small organization. Its members were Yoshimasa Kurokawa, Hisaichi Ugajin, and Satoshi Kirishima.

Copycat crimes 
In the latter half of the 1970s there was a succession of terrorist bombings seen as having been caused by anti-Japanese ideologues influenced by the EAAJAF or Ryu Ota. There were instances where the terrorist attacks were caused by people who called themselves sympathizers of or successors to the EAAJAF.

Although it was acknowledged that they had no direct relation to the imprisoned EAAJAF members, claims of responsibility in the name of the East Asia Anti-Japan Armed Front were put out in a series of terrorist bombings in Hokkaido between 1975 and 1976 including the bombing of a police station on 19 July 1975 that wounded four and the bombing of a government building on 2 March 1976 in which two were killed. Katsuhisa Omori was given the death sentence by the Sapporo District Court for the crimes in 1983, reaffirmed in 1994 and 2007, and is currently on death row, though he proclaims his innocence and admits only to sympathizing with the ideas contained within the claims of responsibility. Another sympathizer is Saburo Kato, who wounded 6 in his bombing of the Association of Shinto Shrines in Tokyo on 27 October 1977.

A case occurred near the end of March 1985 in which threatening letters were placed in several large supermarkets near JNR's Yokohama Station that read "I will blow up this store with plastic explosives. —East Asia Anti-Japan Armed Front". In a series of incidents 40 such letters were placed and threatening phone calls were made including demands for money, but on March 30 when police were on the lookout they caught in the act a third-year male middle school student from Midori-ku Yokohama. He said that his motive was to extort money as in the Glico Morinaga case and that he also copied a tactic of the East Asia Anti-Japan Armed Front which he learned about at a library.

See also 
 New Left in Japan
Anti-Japaneseism
Red Army Faction (Japan)
Japanese Red Army
United Red Army
Hara Hara Tokei
Tori Kudo
 Revolutionary Communist League, National Committee
 Japan Revolutionary Communist League (Revolutionary Marxist Faction)
 Anti-Germans (political current)

References

Bibliography 
 Andrews, William Dissenting Japan: A History of Japanese Radicalism and Counterculture, from 1945 to Fukushima. London: Hurst, 2016. 
 Ryuichi Matsushita『狼煙を見よ 東アジア反日武装戦線"狼"部隊』
 （読売新聞社・戦後ニッポンを読む、1997） 
 （河出書房新社・松下竜一その仕事22、2000）

External links
Website with information on the East Asia Anti-Japan Armed Front 

Anarchist organizations in Japan
Anti-Japanese sentiment
Communism in Japan
Defunct anarchist militant groups
Defunct communist militant groups
Far-left politics in Japan
Left-wing militant groups in Japan
Terrorism in Japan